The 1992 Troy State Trojans football team represented Troy State University—now known as Troy University—as an independent during the 1992 NCAA Division II football season. Led by second-year head coach Larry Blakeney, the Trojan compiled a record of 10–1. Troy State played home games at Veterans Memorial Stadium in Troy, Alabama. 

This a transitional season for Troy State, as they were moving from NCAA Division II to the NCAA's Division I-AA. Despite the successful record, the Trojans were unranked. They were also ineligible to compete in postseason playoffs.

Schedule

References

Troy State
Troy Trojans football seasons
Troy State Trojans football